SBS Gayo Daejeon (broadly SBS Battle of the Bands) is an annual televised music festival that is broadcast by the Seoul Broadcasting System at the end of each year. The program first aired in 1997, and awards were given to musical artists from 1997 to 2006. The awards ceremony portion of the festival was revived in 2014 and discontinued the following year.

Hosts

Music festival (2007–2013)

2007 
Performers at the 2007 festival included Big Bang, CL, F.T. Island, G.Soul, Girls' Generation, Jinusean, Lim Jeong-hee, SeeYa, Se7en, SG Wannabe, Super Junior, The Grace, Wonder Girls, Younha, and 1TYM. The festival ended with a performance by boy band Shinhwa in celebration of their tenth anniversary.

2008: Festival S 
The 2008 festival was divided into segments based on themes starting with the letter "S," including "Super Rookie," "Sexy," "Star Wars," and "Stand up." Performers included Big Bang, BoA, Brown Eyed Girls, Davichi, Epik High, Eun Ji-won, Jang Yun-jeong, Jewelry, Kara, Kim Jong-kook, Park Hyun-bin, Rain, Seo Taiji, SG Wannabe, Shinee, Son Dam-bi, Song Dae-kwan, Super Junior-H, Tae Jin-ah, Taeyeon, TVXQ, Wonder Girls, 2AM, and 2PM.

2009: Wonder World 
The theme of the 2009 festival was "Wonder World." Performers included After School, Beast, Brown Eyed Girls, Davichi, F(x), G-Dragon, Girls' Generation, J. Y. Park, Kara, Kim Tae-woo, K.Will, Lee Seung-gi, MBLAQ, Shinee, Son Dam-bi, Super Junior, Taeyang, T-ara, 2AM, 2PM, 2NE1, and 4Minute.

2010: Welcome to Music Factory 
The 2010 festival, entitled, "Welcome to Music Factory," included a collaborative performance of Britney Spears' song "Circus," featuring Taemin (Shinee), Seohyun (Girls' Generation), Jiyeon (T-ara), Chansung (2PM), Mir (MBLAQ), Sulli (F(x)), and Lizzy (After School), all of whom were the youngest members in their respective music groups.

Other performers included CNBLUE, GD & TOP, Hong Jin-young, Jang Yun-jeong, Kim Gun-mo, Kim Jong-seo, Miss A, Narsha, Park Hyun-bin, Sistar, Son Dam-bi, Super Junior, Tae Jin-ah, ZE:A, and 2NE1.

2011: Korean Wave 
The 2011 edition of the festival was held at the Korea International Exhibition Center (KINTEX) under the theme of "K-pop Stars" and the Korean Wave. Performers included 2NE1, Girls' Generation, TVXQ, Super Junior, Wonder Girls, Kim Hyun-joong, Kara, Yoon Mi-rae, Leessang, Dynamic Duo, Brown Eyed Girls, CNBLUE, Miss A, 4Minute, f(x), IU, Shinee, After School, G.NA, Secret, Sistar, MBLAQ, T-ara, Davichi, The Grace, F.T. Island, K.Will, 2PM, U-Kiss, B1A4, Rainbow, Infinite, Apink, Boyfriend, Dal Shabet, and Beast.

The ceremony also featured a series of collaboration stages from artists including IU and Yoeob, K. Will and Tiffany, 2PM's Jun. K and Davichi. SMTown presented a special stage with TVXQ and Kai, Luhan, Tao, and Chen of the agency's new boy group Exo, who would eventually debut in April of the following year.

2012: Color of K-Pop 
The 2012 SBS Gayo Daejeon aired live from Korea University.
Performers were TVXQ, Super Junior, Big Bang, Dynamic Duo, Epik High, f(x), Shinee, Ailee, B1A4, 2NE1, Secret, B.A.P, Sistar, T-ara, Glam, Teen Top, CN Blue, Exo, F.T. Island, Miss A, MBLAQ, Apink, Infinite, 4Minute, 2AM, After School, Beast, and Kara.

Under the theme "The Color of K-Pop", some of the biggest groups created four super idol groups, recorded a new single, and performed it together on stage. There were four teams consisting of members from different idols groups labeled under the names of Mystic White, Dramatic Blue, Dynamic Black, and Dazzling Red, who sang songs created by the hottest producers of 2012.

2013: "You Are A Miracle"

PD Kim Yong Kwon stated, "Since the top singers are gathering together for the year-end ceremony, we wanted to do something meaningful. The singers will sing one song together and create a music video. All proceeds from the music and music videos will be donated through SBS's charity channel."

The collaboration song, "You Are A Miracle" has 125 participating singers, including Lee Seung Chul, Kim Jo Han, Park Jin Young, Tiger JK, Yoon Mirae, Lee Hyori, Sung Si Kyung, Kim Hee-chul, Brown Eyed Girls, K.Will, Sunmi, Big Bang, Kara, Girls' Generation, Shinee, 2PM, IU, After School, 2NE1, 4minute, f(x), Beast, CNBLUE, ZE:A, Infinite, Miss A, Teen Top, Girl's Day, Apink, B1A4, Ailee, Exo, B.A.P, and more.

Award show (2014)

2014 
2014's Gayo Daejeon took place on the 21st December at the COEX Hall. It was hosted by Jung Yong-hwa, Nichkhun, Mino, Baro, L, and Song Ji-hyo. Awards were included in this year after being discontinued in 2007. Awards were removed again in 2015 not to be added again.

Award winners (2014)

 Album Grand Prize: Overdose by Exo-K and Exo-M
 Song Grand Prize: "Some" by Soyou and Junggigo
 Top Ten Artists: Exo, Girl's Day, Akdong Musician, Ailee, Sistar, 2NE1, Apink, Beast, Taeyang, Infinite
 Rookie Award: Winner
 Best Male Singer: Taeyang
 Best Female Singer: Ailee
 Best Male Group: Exo
 Best Female Group: 2NE1
 Global Star Award: 2PM
 Best Band Award: CNBLUE

Music festival (2015–present)

2015 
2015's Gayo Daejeon took place on the 27th December at COEX Hall. It was hosted by IU and Shin Dong-yup.

Performers:

 2PM 
 4Minute 
 Apink 
 Ailee 
 AOA 
 B1A4 
 B.A.P 
 BtoB 
 CNBLUE 
 EXID 
 Exo 
 GFriend 
 Got7 
 Hyukoh 
 iKon 
 Infinite 
 IU 
 Lovelyz 
 Mamamoo 
 Monsta X 
 Red Velvet 
 Seventeen 
 Shinee 
 Girls' Generation 
 T-ara 
 Twice 
 UP10TION 
 VIXX 
 Wonder Girls

2016: K-POP A-Z 
2016's Gayo Daejeon took place on the 26th December at COEX Hall. It was hosted by You Hee-Yeol, Yuri of Girls' Generation, and Baekhyun of Exo. The theme was "K-Pop A-Z".

2017: Number One 
2017's Gayo Daejeon took place on the 25th December at Gocheok Sky Dome. It was hosted by You Hee-Yeol & IU. The theme was "Number One", and featured all artists who placed number 1 in the charts. There were special stages and collaborations throughout the show.

Performers:

Heize
IU
Lee Juck
Sunmi
Uhm Jung-hwa
You Hee-yeol
Blackpink
BtoB
BTS
Exo
GFriend
Got7
NCT 127 
Red Velvet
Twice
Wanna One
Winner

Butterfly was sung as promotion for the 2018 PyeongChang Winter Olympics.

2018: The Wave
2018's Gayo Daejeon took place on the 25th December at Gocheok Sky Dome. It was hosted by Jun Hyun-moo and Jo Bo-ah. The theme was "The Wave".

On the 16 December 2018 episode of Inkigayo, a teaser video revealed two special stages, a collaboration between NCT, Wanna One, Seventeen, Winner, and Got7, and a collaboration between Red Velvet and Twice.

Performers:

Sunmi
(G)I-dle
Apink
Blackpink
BtoB
BTS
Exo
GFriend
Got7
IKon
Mamamoo
Momoland
Monsta X
NCT
Red Velvet
Seventeen
Stray Kids
The Boyz
Twice
Wanna One
Winner

2019: Touch
2019's Gayo Daejeon took place on the 25th December at Gocheok Sky Dome. It was hosted by Jun Hyun-moo and Seolhyun.

Performers:

Chungha
AOA
Apink
Astro
BTS
GFriend
Got7
Itzy
Mamamoo
Monsta X
N.Flying
NCT 127
NCT Dream
NU'EST
Oh My Girl
Seventeen
Stray Kids
Twice
Tomorrow X Together

Red Velvet was originally scheduled to perform but had to cancel after Wendy was injured (and subsequently hospitalized) during her solo rehearsal.

2020: The Wonder Year
2020's Gayo Daejeon took place on the 25th December in Daegu.  It was hosted by Boom, Heechul and Na Eun. Due to COVID-19 restrictions, '2020 SBS Gayo Daejeon in DAEGU' was a pre-recorded event.

Performers:

BTS
Twice 
Seventeen
Got7
Monsta X
Mamamoo
Jessi
NU'EST
GFriend
Oh My Girl
Iz*One 
The Boyz
Stray Kids
(G)I-dle
Ateez
Itzy 
Tomorrow X Together
April 
Momoland
Cravity
Treasure
Aespa
Enhypen
Uhm Jung-hwa
Lee Juck

2021: Welcome
2021's Gayo Daejeon, themed "Welcome", took place on 25 December at Incheon. It was hosted by Boom, Shinee's Key, and Itzy's Yuna, and broadcast live at Namdong Gymnasium from 18:00 (KST).

Performers:

Key (Shinee)
NU'EST
Red Velvet
Oh My Girl
Brave Girls
NCT 127
NCT Dream
Astro
The Boyz
Stray Kids
Ateez
Itzy
Tomorrow X Together
Aespa
STAYC
Enhypen 
Ive
Woodz 
Yoo Tae-yang (SF9) 
Minnie ((G)I-dle)
Lee Chae-yeon
Simon Dominic
Gray
Loco
Lee Hi

Notes

2022: The Live Shout Out
2022's Gayo Daejeon was held on December 24, 2022, and was hosted by SHINee's Key, Astro's Cha Eun-woo and Ive's An Yu-jin. It was broadcast live at Gocheok Sky Dome from 19:30 (KST).
 
Performers:

 10cm
 Aespa
 Ateez
 The Boyz
 Cha Jun-hwan
 Cravity
 Enhypen
 Fromis 9
 (G)I-dle
 Itzy
 Ive
 Jaurim
 Le Sserafim
 NCT 127
 NCT Dream
 NewJeans
 Nmixx
 Stray Kids
 Tempest
 Tomorrow X Together
 Younha

Notes

Award winners

Grand Prize (Daesang)

Main Prize (Bonsang)

Rookie Award

Rock Award

Hip Hop Award

Dance Award

Trot Award

Ballad Award

R&B Award

Professional Awards

SBS Producer's Award

Popularity awards

Other awards

Gallery

General references 
2000 Award winners: 
2001 Award winners: ; 
2002 Award winners: 
2003 Award winners: 
 2004 Award winners: 
 2005 Award winners: 
 2006 Award winners:

See also
KBS Song Festival
MBC Gayo Daejejeon

References

Seoul Broadcasting System original programming
Annual events in South Korea
South Korea annual television specials